Acharya Institute of Technology, or AIT, is a private co-educational engineering and management college in Bengaluru, India, affiliated with the Visvesvaraya Technological University (VTU) and accredited by the National Board of Accreditation (NBA). Established in 2000, it offers eleven undergraduate courses and eight postgraduate courses.
The college has links and collaborations with various industries and universities across the world. It is one of the several institutes run by the JMJ Education Society.

AIT organises the Acharya Habba, an annual 2 days long inter-collegiate cultural festival that is one of the largest in Bengaluru and Karnataka.

The Deccan Herald lists AIT as one of the "notable" colleges to apply the Karnataka Management Aptitude Test (KMAT) for admission to postgraduate management courses.

History

The Acharya Institute of Technology (AIT) was established in 2000 by Premnath Reddy, Chairman of the Acharya Group of Institutions. The college is managed by the JMJ Education Society, Headquartered in Bengaluru. AIT offers Thirteen Bachelor of Engineering (BE) courses, Six Master of Technology (MTech) courses, Master of Business Administration (MBA), Master of Computer Applications (MCA) and a PhD course in Mathematics. All courses are affiliated to the Visvesvaraya Technological University (VTU). It was the first college under the VTU to start an undergraduate course in Mechatronics in Karnataka.

The road was inaugurated by Shivakumara Swamiji of Siddaganga Math in September 2010. It is named Acharya Dr. Sarvepalli Radhakrishnan Road after former Indian President Sarvepalli Radhakrishnan.

In 2012, the institute was granted "Technical Campus" status by the All India Council for Technical Education (AICTE).

In news - a third year engineering student was stabbed to death, allegedly by his classmate, after the two got into an argument over attendance shortage in class on Wednesday afternoon.

Both were students of the Acharya Institute of Technology, near Peenya First Stage.

Academic profile

Admission criteria

AIT admits 50 percent students on the basis of their rank in the Common Entrance Test (CET) conducted by the Government of Karnataka and 30 percent students through the Undergraduate Entrance Test of the Consortium of Medical, Engineering and Dental Colleges (COMEDK) of Karnataka. It also admits 20 percent students under a management quota without merit requirements and has admitted about 150 foreigners from 25 countries under "PIO Quota".

There is a lateral entry scheme in place, by which students holding diploma degrees can enter directly into the second year of study in engineering. After completing their graduation, students receive a BE degree from the VTU. Students are admitted to postgraduate courses on the basis of their test scores in the Graduate Aptitude Test in Engineering, as well as on their Karnataka Postgraduate Common Entrance Test (PGCET) and KMAT scores.

Departments and courses

Undergraduate courses
The college offers four-year BE courses in the following subjects. All are recognised by VTU.
Artificial Intelligence and Machine Learning
Aeronautical Engineering
Automobile Engineering
Biotechnology
Civil Engineering
Computer Science
Construction technology
Electronics & Communication Engineering
Electrical & Electronics Engineering
Manufacturing Science & Engineering
Mechatronics Engineering
Mechanical Engineering
Mining Engineering
Information Science & Engineering

Postgraduate courses
The college offers the following two-year postgraduate courses, all recognised by the VTU.
MBA
MCA
MTech in Biotechnology
MTech in Computer Networking Engineering
MTech in Computer Science and Engineering
MTech in Digital Communication Engineering
MTech in Machine Design
MTech in Power Systems

Faculty
AIT maintains a teacher-student ratio of 1:40. It is the first college in Karnataka to put in effect the Sixth Central Pay Commission recommendations for faculty pay scale.

Research Centers
The Institute receives a "Modernisation and Removal of Obsolescence" grant from the AICTE for research activities and upgraded laboratory facilities. The Visvesvaraya Technological University recognises the college's departments of Biotechnology, Electronics and Communication Engineering, Mathematics, and Mechanical Engineering as research centers:

Accreditation
AIT is accredited by the National Board of Accreditation (NBA). It was the first college of the Visvesvaraya Technological University to start an undergraduate course in Mechatronics in Karnataka. It is one of the seven colleges in Karnataka to be funded by the World Bank and receives endowments from the VTU to carry out research in both its undergraduate and postgraduate departments.

Administration

Governing Council
The Governing Council of the college consists of 11 members. The body comprises five members from the JMJ Education Society, one staff representative, one member of the Indian University Grants Commission, one AICTE nominee, one Government of Karnataka nominee, one Department of Technical Education nominee, one university nominee, and one Member Secretary, the Principal.

Academic Council
The Academic Council of the college is headed by the Principal. Student enrollments, academics, assessments and examinations are managed by the respective deans, the Controller of Examinations and appointed faculty members. The college administration is managed by the Director of Administration. The research department is headed by the Director of Research and Development. The placement department is managed by the Principal, the Human Resource Director and one expert in the subject. Each academic department is headed by a head of department.

Proctorial system
Faculty members are appointed as proctors for the students of their departments to monitor their attendance, performance in tests, extracurricular activities and personality development. Each proctor supervises 20 students per semester.

Campus

Educational facilities

The college has a Central Library with EDUSAT programmes, E-learning facilities and an Online Public Access Catalog (OPAC) gateway. It has various collaborations with multinational corporations and has established learning facilities like the Vasundhara Industrial Automation Learning Center, the IBM Software Center of Excellence, the Microsoft IT Academy and the Novell Centre of Excellence. The International Academy for Competency Enhancement provides students and recent graduates with English language skills and technical training to equip them for work in industry.

Entrepreneur Incubation Cell
The college has signed a Memorandum of Understanding with IBM and has established the IBM Entrepreneur Incubation Center on the campus.

Infrastructure
The college provides all-hours Wi-Fi access on campus. It has an auditorium with a capacity of over 500 seats, board rooms, conference and seminar halls. The institute has its own multipurpose stadium, the Smt. Nagarathnama Stadium, with a capacity of over 10,000 people. The college has a National Technical Manpower Information System (NTMIS) and an ATM outlet operated by Axis Bank. The college operates a campus clinic to provide medical facilities to the students. AIT has been awarded with "Technical Campus" status by AICTE. A striking feature of the architecture of every building is that it is made in the shape of the initials of every department when seen from the top. (For ex.: M for Mechanical, E for Electrical). Have a look at the satellite view to believe us.

Environmental Initiatives
The campus has its own sewage treatment plant, has made use of rain water harvesting and has a four-acre artificial lake.

Hostels and canteens
AIT provides hostel accommodation for both boys and girls. The hostel mess serves North Indian and South Indian with vegetarian and non vegetarian options. The college has a food court, a cafeteria and a canteen, which serve vegetarian food. The campus also houses a Coffee Day Xpress operated by Coffee Day.

Recreational facilities
The college's Student Activity Center provides indoor games. The institute also organises yoga learning camps on campus for the students.

Industry interaction

The college has industry collaborations and has signed memoranda of understanding with the Computer Society of India (CSI), Environ Software Pvt Ltd, IBM, Infosys, the Indian Society for Technical Education (ISTE), Keane, Microsoft, Novell, Oracle, SAP Labs, Sun Microsystems, United Technologies, Vasundhara Automation and Engineering Services Pvt. Ltd., VMware, Wipro and many other leading companies to increase interaction with industry.

University twinning programs
The college has tie-ups in India, with Mysore University and the Indian Institute of Technology, Bombay.

Cultural activities

Acharya Habba
The college organises the Acharya Habba, an annual inter-collegiate culfest that attracts a crowd of over 30,000 students from over 300 colleges across Karnataka.

Ethnic day
Students dress up in their traditional clothes, highlighting the cultural importance of the region they come from.

Freshers' day
The freshers are welcomed by the seniors of various college departments in an extravagant and cheerful way. The students organise various cultural, extra-curricular and technical activities to greet and encourage the new freshers. Stalls are organised by different departments and clubs of the college to exhibit its facilities, rules and regulations, and achievements.

Bangalore Open Air 2012 - Heavy Metal festival
The college hosted India's first heavy metal festival on 16 June 2012 as a part of Bangalore Open Air 2012 backed by Germany's Wacken Open Air at the college stadium. German heavy metal bands and Teutonic thrash metal bands like the Kreator and the Suidakra along with an American Power metal band and Indian metal bands namely Kryptos, Eccentric Pendulum, Dying Embrace, 1833 AD, Bevar Sea and Albatross performed in the fest. Although Iced Earth were scheduled to perform at the fest but backed out due to the denial of Visa by the Indian embassy.

ME Stori 2018

The college hosted a talk show where the most beautiful people known for defeat, knows struggle, knows suffering - the real life heroes came in to share their experiences. The speaker line had people from Bangalore's Billionaire Barber Mr Ramesh Babu to inspiring economist Dr. M.V. Srinivasa Gowda.

Technical activities

Technical chapters
Conferences, workshops and training programmes are organised in various technical chapters, including:
Associate Member of the Institution of Engineers (AMIE) Chapters
Computer Society of India (CSI) Chapters
Center for Social Service and Skill Promotion (SKIP) Chapters
Institution of Engineers (IE) Chapters
Institute of Electrical and Electronics Engineers (IEEE) Chapters
Indian Society for Technical Education (ISTE) Chapters
Science and Technology Entrepreneurs Park (STEP) Chapters

Departmental associations and forums 
The departments of the college conduct technical and extracurricular departmental forums for students and staff. Some of them are:

Departmental publications
The departments of the college have their own publications to provide broad knowledge and up-to-date information on technology. They include:

Student projects
Hovercraft
A one-seater hovercraft was designed by a team of mechanical engineering students of AIT as their final year project work. It is 8.5 feet long and runs on a Yezdi Roadking 250cc, 16 bhp, two-stroke engine.
The engine can accommodate high-load operating conditions and has been designed for low-speed operation. It can carry up to 260 kilograms. The hovercraft is equipped with GPS and the construction costs are lower than usual for this type of vehicle.

Other
A miniature car and a motor bike have been designed by the students of AIT. They are fuel efficient and can run on alternative sources of energy, avoiding the use of fossil fuels.

Student counselling and guidance
DH-PV edu-counselling

Every year, in collaboration with Indian newspapers Deccan Herald and Prajavani, AIT organises career counselling for students who have just passed their Higher Secondary and university and college admissions examinations.

Jnana Degula

The college co-organises an annual educational fair known as the Jnana Degula in the grounds of Bangalore Palace to help the students make an informed career choice which corresponds to their undergraduate education. The fair attracts various institutions across Karnataka to set up stalls showcasing their colleges and their facilities.

Student clubs
Some of the student clubs at AIT are:

Placements

The Training and Placement Cell helps students to find jobs in Indian and multinational companies. It appoints student placement coordinators from every department to manage its activities. The coordinators are guided by placement directors. The placement cell also organises multiple-campus placement drives for government and private colleges located in rural places of Karnataka.

References

External links

Acharya Institute of Technology (AIT)

Educational institutions established in 2000
Affiliates of Visvesvaraya Technological University
All India Council for Technical Education
Engineering colleges in Bangalore
2000 establishments in Karnataka